"Quiet Life" is a song by the British new wave band Japan. It is the title track of their 1979 album Quiet Life. The lyrics to the song refer to the problems the band was going through at the time. They had lost their US record contract and Hansa Records had been pressuring them for a hit single in the UK.

"Quiet Life" was first released as a single in Japan in December 1979 with the B-side "Halloween". In March 1980, it was released in Germany and the Netherlands with the B-side "Second That Emotion", whereas in the UK "Quiet Life" was released as the B-side of the unsuccessful "Second That Emotion". Following the commercial success of the band's 1981 album Tin Drum, Hansa Records reissued the song as a single that year to promote the band's upcoming compilation album Assemblage. It became a top 20 hit on the UK Singles Chart, peaking at number 19 in October 1981 for 2 weeks.

Track listings
7": Ariola / AHA 1013 (1979, Japan)
"Quiet Life" – 4:14
"Halloween" – 4:24

7": Hansa (1980, Germany and the Netherlands)
"Quiet Life" – 3:51
"Second That Emotion" – 3:46
7" B-side: Ariola / AHA 559 (1980, UK)
 "Second That Emotion" – 3:46
 "Quiet Life" – 3:51

7": Hansa / HANSA 6 (1981, UK)
"Quiet Life" – 3:34
"A Foreign Place" – 3:11

12" Hansa / HANSA 12-6 (1981, UK)
"Quiet Life" (Extended Version) – 4:50
"A Foreign Place" – 3:11
"Fall in Love With Me" – 4:30

Charts

References

1979 songs
1979 singles
1980 singles
1981 singles
Japan (band) songs
Songs written by David Sylvian